Supergirl (also known as Cir-El or Mia) is a fictional superhero appearing in American comic books published by DC Comics. The character is best known as one of the characters to have assumed the mantle of Supergirl. Created by writer Steven Seagle and artist Scott McDaniel, she first appeared in Superman: The 10¢ Adventure #1 (2003) as the alleged daughter of Superman. She is later found to be a human girl who was genetically altered by the villain Brainiac to appear Kryptonian. The character dies thwarting a plot involving Brainiac 13. Superman (vol. 2) #200 implies that when the timeline realigned itself, Cir-El was erased from existence.

Fictional character biography

Superman: The 10¢ Adventure
When a crazed villain named Radion attacks Metropolis, a young girl in a costume leaps into battle and throws the villain into a nuclear reactor (in front of a TV news crew and Lois Lane). The girl identifies later herself as Supergirl, Superman's daughter. Upset, Lois confronts Superman, accusing him of having an affair (even listing Wonder Woman and Zatanna as possible lovers), and refusing to believe his claim of innocence, since "Supergirl" looks just like him. However, after a cup of the new "Yes" coffee, Lois suddenly calms down and dismisses "Supergirl" as a villain's hoax, until she lands in front of Lois and calls her "Mommy". Superman confronts the girl, who argues that she is his daughter with Lois, and that her name is "Cir-El". Cir-El says that she is from the future, brought to the past by the Futuresmiths. When Superman encounters the Futuresmiths, they show him a horrific future, with robotic monsters attacking civilians, and he sees himself as a cybernetic Superman attacking civilians as well. The Futuresmiths tell him that Cir-El's death will prevent this future, and as they turn to attack her, Superman flies her to safety. S.T.A.R. Labs confirms that she is his daughter, but that Lois is not her mother. Regardless of her identity, Superman comes to regard Cir-El as family.

Cir-El helps Superman fight off a diseased Bizarro. Later, with the aid of Natasha Irons and Girl 13, she fights off a vengeance-crazed superhuman ninja who is trying to kill Superman. When Superman and Batman are said to be "captured" by President Lex Luthor in Superman/Batman "Public Enemies", Cir-El teams up with Superboy, Krypto, Natasha Irons, and the Batman Family to rescue them. Batman, not actually having been captured, is the one to save Cir-El and Superboy from a White House death trap.

Superman has a shock when, while talking to Cir-El, she changes into an angry young woman named Mia, who hates her Cir-El persona. Superman's Kryptonian robot Kelex subsequently confirms that Cir-El is not the Man of Steel's biological daughter (despite the evidence from S.T.A.R. Labs). While the girl's D.N.A. has some Kryptonian attributes, she is primarily human.

Rewritten history
Disaster strikes when a future Superman appears and shows Superman a devastating future with Lois dying, Wonder Woman and Batman turned into cyborgs by a nano-tech virus concealed in coffee, and Cir-El trapped in a giant Brainiac robot. Brainiac reveals that Cir-El is his "Trojan Horse", that he has concealed part of himself in the one thing he knows Superman would never harm: his 'child'. Cir-El was created by Brainiac by grafting some Kryptonian DNA onto the body of Mia. He then implanted false memories in Cir-El and had his servants, the Futuresmiths, send her out into the world (along with the nano-virus, which was placed in coffee to proliferate the virus and infect the population) in order to unknowingly alter the future, and lead Superman to create a synthetic body to save Lois from her "Yes" infection in the future (for Brainiac to inhabit). Horrified, Cir-El throws herself into a time portal to prevent herself from being born, and thus, prevent the future from ever happening.

The return of Cir-El

Thanks to the time-traveling efforts of Bizarro in Superman/Batman #24, Cir-El is able to join Linda Danvers, Kara Zor-El (both Modern Age and Pre-Crisis versions) and Power Girl to rescue Superman from the Source Wall. The girls are successful, but Superman only recognizes Kara, Power Girl, and Linda, due to Cir-El and pre-Crisis Kara Zor-El coming from previously erased timelines.

Cir-El and the other Supergirls then assist Superman and Batman in a reality-altering fight against various menaces from many alternate dimensions. At the conclusion of the fight, Mister Mxyzptlk sent Cir-El and everyone else involved back to their appropriate locations.

Powers and abilities
A hybrid of human/Kryptonian origin, Cir-El can absorb yellow sunlight to gain immense strength, durability, speed, and hearing. Originally, Cir-El was able to leap great distances, but later she eventually displayed her flying capabilities. Cir-El's "trademark" power is the ability to release stored energy from her hands as blasts of red solar radiation (the very wavelength of sunlight that Superman loses his powers under) that strike an enemy with intense heat and force she named "Red Sunbursts".  Like Superman, she is also vulnerable to Kryptonite.

Costume
Cir-El's outfit appeared to be a legless black leotard, not unlike Power Girl's classic white leotard, but with short sleeves instead of long. Also similar to Power Girl, Cir-El wore gloves and boots, both black. Her uniform was topped off with a dark blue, knee-length cape. Instead of the traditional S-Shield, Cir-El instead sported a simple large red letter S that went down the length of her upper torso.

Other versions
In Action Comics #994, an alternate timeline appears where Krypton was never destroyed. In this timeline, Kal-El's younger sister sports short black hair and a black costume with a blue cape. 
In Superman & Batman: Generations volume three, Superman's great granddaughter Lara has short black hair and a very similar uniform (black leotard with blue cape).

In other media

Injustice 2
In the video game Injustice 2, Cir-El is referenced as the name of two of Supergirl's alternate costume color palettes.

The Flash
Sasha Calle will portray Cir-El version of Supergirl in The Flash, she confirmed that on Instagram and Facebook.

References

Comics characters introduced in 2003
DC Comics characters who can move at superhuman speeds
DC Comics characters with superhuman senses
DC Comics characters with superhuman strength
DC Comics female superheroes
DC Comics hybrids
Kryptonians
Fictional characters from parallel universes
Fictional characters with absorption or parasitic abilities
Fictional characters with energy-manipulation abilities
Fictional characters with fire or heat abilities
Fictional characters with nuclear or radiation abilities
Fictional characters with superhuman durability or invulnerability
Fictional extraterrestrial–human hybrids in comics
Cir-El
Characters created by Steven T. Seagle
Superman characters